Sarkaran (also Romanized as Sarkarān) is a village in Shamshir Rural District, in the Central District of Paveh County, Kermanshah Province, Iran. At the 2006 census, its population was 275, in 65 families.

References 

Populated places in Paveh County